Riverside School may refer to:

 Riverside School, Barking, United Kingdom
 Riverside School, Goole, Goole, United Kingdom
 Riverside School, Prague, Czech Republic
 Riverside School (Fishers, Indiana), United States
 Riverside School (Elkins, West Virginia), United States, a historic school building
 Riverside School (Zimbabwe), Gweru, Zimbabwe

See also
 Riverside School District (disambiguation)